Jaranwala railway station is located in the town of Jaranwala, Faisalabad District, Pakistan on the Pakistan Railways Shorkot–Sheikhupura Branch Line.

Jaranwala–Lyallpur branch line

The Jaranwala–Lyallpur branch line was constructed between Jaranwala and Lyallpur (present-day Faisalabad), but it was later uprooted. Railway line land, bridges and railway stations between Jaranwala and Faisalabad still exist.

See also
 List of railway stations in Pakistan
 Pakistan Railways
Jaranwala-Lyallpur Branch Line

References

External links

Railway stations in Faisalabad District
Railway stations on Shorkot–Sheikhupura line